María del Carmen Ramírez García (born 8 March 1956) is a Mexican politician affiliated with the Party of the Democratic Revolution (PRD) who served in the upper house of the Mexican Congress during the LVIII and LIX Legislatures.

Born in Toluca, she graduated from the National Autonomous University of Mexico in 1979. Ramírez García is married to Alfonso Sánchez Anaya. Her husband is a former member of the Institutional Revolutionary Party (PRI) who in 1999 won the governorship of Tlaxcala representing an alliance between the PRD, the PVEM and the PT; hence from 1999 to 2000 Ramírez García served as President of the DIF in the state of Tlaxcala.

In 2005 she unsuccessfully ran for the governorship of Tlaxcala losing against the PAN-PT candidate Héctor Ortiz Ortiz.

References

Living people
1956 births
Party of the Democratic Revolution politicians
Members of the Senate of the Republic (Mexico)
Women members of the Senate of the Republic (Mexico)
21st-century Mexican politicians
21st-century Mexican women politicians
National Autonomous University of Mexico alumni
People from Toluca
Politicians from the State of Mexico